Antoine Douglas (born September 4, 1992) is an American professional boxer.

On July 25, 2014 Douglas fought to a draw against Michel Soro.

On March 5, 2016 Douglas lost to Avtandil Khurtsidze.

On March 27, 2017 Douglas defeated Eduardo Mercedes to win the WBC FECARBOX middleweight title.

On December 16, 2017 Douglas lost to Gary O'Sullivan.

Professional boxing record

References

External links

Living people
1992 births
American male boxers
Boxers from Virginia
Sportspeople from Fairfax County, Virginia
People from Burke, Virginia
Middleweight boxers